Moussa Traoré (born on 8 May 1995) is a Guinean footballer who plays as a goalkeeper.

Club career
Born in Conakry, Traoré moved to Vitoria-Gasteiz at the age of eight and started playing for CD Aurrerá de Vitoria. He made his senior debut with CD Ariznabarra in the 2014–15 campaign, in the regional leagues, before joining CD Mirandés and being assigned to the reserves in 2015.

In January 2019, Traoré joined another reserve team, CD Vitoria in Segunda División B, but failed to make an appearance for the side. On 18 July 2019, he was announced at Campeonato de Portugal side F.C. Arouca.

International career
Traoré was first called up for the Guinea national team on 26 October 2017, ahead of a 2018 FIFA World Cup qualifiers against DR Congo. He made his full international debut on 11 November, starting in the 1–3 away loss at the Stade des Martyrs in Kinshasa.

References

External links

1995 births
Living people
Sportspeople from Conakry
Guinean footballers
Association football goalkeepers
Tercera División players
CD Mirandés B players
CD Vitoria footballers
F.C. Arouca players
Guinea international footballers
Guinean expatriate footballers
Guinean expatriate sportspeople in Spain
Guinean expatriate sportspeople in Portugal
Expatriate footballers in Spain
Expatriate footballers in Portugal